The Bell Jar is the only novel written by the American writer and poet Sylvia Plath. Originally published under the pseudonym "Victoria Lucas" in 1963, the novel is semi-autobiographical with the names of places and people changed. The book is often regarded as a roman à clef because the protagonist's descent into mental illness parallels Plath's own experiences with what may have been clinical depression or bipolar II disorder. Plath died by suicide a month after its first United Kingdom publication. The novel was published under Plath's name for the first time in 1967 and was not published in the United States until 1971, in accordance with the wishes of both Plath's husband, Ted Hughes, and her mother.  The novel has been translated into nearly a dozen languages.

Plot summary
In 1953, Esther Greenwood, a nineteen-year-old undergraduate student from the suburbs of Boston,  is awarded a summer internship at the fictional Ladies' Day magazine in New York City. During the internship, Esther feels neither stimulated nor excited by the work, fashion, and big-city lifestyle that her peers in the program seem to adore. She finds herself struggling to feel anything at all aside from anxiety and disorientation. Esther appreciates the witty sarcasm and adventurousness of another intern, Doreen, but also identifies with the piety of Betsy, an old-fashioned and naïve young woman. Esther has a benefactress in Philomena Guinea, a formerly successful writer of women's fiction, who funds the scholarship through which Esther – from a working-class family – is enrolled at her college. 

Esther describes in detail several seriocomic incidents that occur during her internship, beginning with mass food-poisoning of the interns from a lunch thrown by the staff of the magazine. She reminisces about her boyfriend Buddy, whom she has dated more or less seriously, and who considers himself her de facto fiancé. Esther's internal monologue often lingers on musings of death and violence. Shortly before the internship ends, she attends a country club party with Doreen and is set up with a man who treats her roughly and sexually assaults her, before she breaks his nose and leaves. That night, after returning to the hotel, she impulsively throws all of her brand-new and fashionable gifted clothing off the roof.

Esther returns to her Massachusetts home that she shares with her widowed mother. She has been hoping for another scholarly opportunity once she is back in Massachusetts, a writing course taught by a world-famous author, but on her return she is immediately told by her mother that she was not accepted for the course and finds her plans derailed. She decides to spend the summer potentially writing a novel, although she feels she lacks enough life experience to write convincingly. All of her identity has been centered upon doing well academically; she is unsure of what to make of her life once she leaves school, and none of the choices presented to her (motherhood, as exemplified by the prolific child-bearer Dodo Conway, Esther's neighbor, or stereotypical female careers such as stenography) appeal to her. Esther becomes increasingly depressed, and finds herself unable to sleep. Her mother instructs her to see a psychiatrist, Dr. Gordon, whom Esther mistrusts because he is attractive and doesn't seem to listen to her. He prescribes electroconvulsive therapy (ECT); afterward, she tells her mother that she will not go back.

The ECT is not effective, and Esther's mental state worsens. She makes several half-hearted attempts at suicide, including swimming far out to sea, before making a serious attempt. Esther crawls into a well-hidden hole in the cellar and swallows many sleeping pills that had been prescribed for her insomnia. The newspapers presume her kidnapping and death, but she is discovered alive under her house after an indeterminate amount of time. She is sent to several different mental hospitals until her college benefactress, Philomena Guinea, supports her stay at an elite treatment center where she meets Dr. Nolan, a female therapist. Along with regular psychotherapy sessions, Esther is given huge amounts of insulin to produce a "reaction" (a common – and now disproven – psychiatric treatment at the time) and again receives shock treatments, with Dr. Nolan ensuring that they are properly administered. While there, she describes her depression as a feeling of being trapped under a bell jar, struggling for breath. Eventually, Esther describes the ECT as beneficial in that it has a sort of antidepressant effect; it lifts the metaphorical bell jar in which she has felt trapped and stifled. While there, she also becomes reacquainted with Joan Gilling, who also used to date Buddy. Whilst Esther and Joan are hospitalized, Joan commits suicide unexpectedly. The novel heavily implies that Joan is homosexual, and attracted to or interested in Esther. 

Esther tells Dr. Nolan how she envies the freedom that men have and how she, as a woman, worries about getting pregnant. Dr. Nolan refers her to a doctor who fits her for a diaphragm. Esther now feels free from her fears about the consequences of sex; free from previous pressures to get married, potentially to the wrong man. Under Dr. Nolan, Esther improves. Various significant events, such as having sex for the first time, being hospitalized as a result, and Joan's suicide, provide her with new perspective. Esther interacts with Buddy once again towards the end of the novel, when he visits her to ask if it was something about him that drove women to insanity given that he dated both Joan and Esther. Buddy later wonders out loud who will marry Esther now that she has been hospitalized, effectively ending their commitment to get engaged. Esther feels relieved.

The novel ends with Esther entering a conference with her doctors, who will decide whether she can leave the hospital and return to school.

It is suggested near the beginning of the novel that, in later years, Esther goes on to have a baby.

Characters
 Esther Greenwood is the protagonist of the story, an English student from Boston. While working as a summer intern at Ladies' Day magazine, she lives at the Amazon hotel in New York City along with the other women and girls working for the magazine. Esther becomes mentally unstable during that summer and the following months. The cumulative effects of fear and panic from not knowing what to do in life after graduation, professional setbacks, social alienation, traumatizing encounters such as narrowly avoiding attempted rape, and the feeling that she simply does not fit into the culturally acceptable role of womanhood contribute to her instability. Though it is not immediately apparent, unresolved grief at the death of her father when she was 8 also affects her. Having returned to live with her mother in the suburbs, and experiencing increasing insomnia, loss of appetite, inability to read or write, and she becomes fixated on and later attempts suicide. Before her mental health more precipitously declines, Esther is characterized as a hardworking student, high achieving in prizes and grades, with a vague idea she might go into publishing or being an author and poet. She is also fairly self-interested and prone to feeling withdrawn and tired. She  leaves her friend Doreen with a man they just met after being asked to stay to help protect her. Later, when Doreen arrives late at night back to the hotel they both stay at asking for her, she leaves Doreen, still-drunk, to sleep on the ground near her own vomit rather than set her up in Esther’s bed. 
 Doreen is a rebel-of-the-times young woman and another intern at Ladies' Day, the magazine for which Esther won an internship for the summer, and Esther's best friend at the hotel in New York where all the interns stay. Esther finds Doreen's confident persona enticing but also troublesome, as she longs for the same level of freedom but knows such behavior is frowned upon. Esther takes care to praise Doreen’s appearance, humor, personality, and even smell, which she describes as sweaty and sweet like fresh crushed ferns. At other times Esther repudiates Doreen and swears to have little more to do with her, and to instead be friends with more conventional women like Betsy. When first looking for an escape after failing to get into her desired writing program, Esther thinks to write Doreen and ask to stay with her, but her handwriting has deteriorated and she never sends the letter.
 Joan is an old acquaintance of Esther, who joins her at the asylum. She also dated Buddy Willard, but tells Esther later that she was more interested in keeping up relationship with Buddy’s parents, who she says are much more caring and superior to her own. At the asylum she and Esther have a quiet rivalry over who will become better quicker, as appears to be common culture among the patients. Intruding, Esther finds Joan in bed with another female asylum patient, DeeDee. Esther then reflects on other women who have sex with women she has known. Ambiguously, Joan may later proposition Esther, either romantically or in a gesture of friendship. Esther tells Joan she never liked her. When Esther needs help getting to the hospital while hemorrhaging after sex with Irwin, Joan helps her get there. Joan eventually dies by suicide at the asylum. Esther attends her funeral.
 Doctor Nolan is Esther's doctor at the asylum. A beautiful and caring woman, her combination of personal sensitivity and professional ability allows her to be the first woman in Esther's life she feels she can fully connect with. Nolan administers shock therapy to Esther and does it correctly, which leads to positive results.
 Doctor Gordon is the first doctor Esther encounters. Self-obsessed and patronizing, he subjects her to traumatic shock treatments that haunt her for the rest of her time in medical care.
 Mrs. Greenwood, Esther's mother, loves her daughter but is constantly urging Esther to mold to society's ideal of white, middle-class womanhood, from which Esther feels a complete disconnection.
 Buddy Willard is Esther's former boyfriend from her hometown. Studying to become a doctor, Buddy wants a wife who mirrors his mother, and hopes Esther will be that for him. Esther adores him throughout high school, but upon learning he is not a virgin loses respect for him and names him a hypocrite. She struggles with ending the relationship after Buddy is diagnosed with tuberculosis. He eventually proposes marriage, but Esther rejects him since she has decided she will never marry, to which Buddy responds that she is crazy.
 Mrs. Willard, Buddy Willard's mother, is a dedicated homemaker with conservative views on women’s social roles and sexual propriety who is determined to have Buddy and Esther marry. Joan loves Mrs. Willard and found her to be the mother she never had.
 Mr. Willard, Buddy Willard's father and Mrs. Willard's husband, is a good family friend.
 Constantin, a simultaneous interpreter with a foreign accent, takes Esther on a date while they are both in New York. They return to his apartment and Esther contemplates giving her virginity to him, but for unknown reasons he chooses to spend the night sleeping chastely side by side with Esther instead.
 Irwin is a tall but rather ugly young man, who is Esther’s first sexual experience, causing her to hemorrhage. He is a "very well-paid professor of mathematics" and invites Esther to have coffee, despite not knowing her at all (and not knowing she was out on leave from an asylum). The rare hemorrhage caused by penetrative sex with Irwin leads to Esther having to go to the hospital to get help to stop the bleeding. 
 Jay Cee is Esther's strict boss, who is very intelligent, so "her plug-ugly looks didn't seem to matter". She is responsible for editing Esther's work.
 Lenny Shepherd, a wealthy young man and disc jockey living in New York, invites Doreen and Esther for drinks while they are on their way to a party. They go together to his place. Doreen asks Esther to stay with her in case Lenny “tries anything”, but Esther leaves. Doreen and Lenny start dating, taking Doreen away from Esther more often.
 Philomena Guinea, a wealthy, elderly lady, was the person who donated the money for Esther's college scholarship. Esther's college requires each girl who is on scholarship to write a letter to her benefactor, thanking him or her. Philomena invites Esther to have a meal with her. At one point, she was also in an asylum herself, and pays for the "upscale" asylum that Esther stays in.
 Marco, a Peruvian man and friend of Lenny Shepherd, is set up to take Esther to a party, assaults her, and attempts to rape her.
 Betsy, a wealthier girl from the magazine, is a "good" girl from Kansas whom Esther strives to be more like. She serves as the opposite to Doreen, and Esther finds herself torn between the two behavioral and personality extremes. 
 Hilda is another girl from the magazine, who is generally disliked by Esther after making negative comments about the Rosenbergs, rejoicing in their imminent execution.

Publication history
According to her husband, Plath began writing the novel in 1961, after publishing The Colossus, her first collection of poetry. Plath finished writing the novel in August 1961. After she separated from Hughes, Plath moved to a smaller flat in London, "giving her time and place to work uninterruptedly. Then at top speed and with very little revision from start to finish she wrote The Bell Jar," he explained.

Plath was writing the novel under the sponsorship of the Eugene F. Saxton Fellowship, affiliated with publisher Harper & Row, but it was disappointed by the manuscript and withdrew, calling it "disappointing, juvenile and overwrought". Early working titles of the novel included Diary of a Suicide and The Girl in the Mirror.

Style and major themes
The novel is written using a series of flashbacks that reveal parts of Esther's past. The flashbacks primarily deal with Esther's relationship with Buddy Willard. The reader also learns more about her early college years.

Womanhood and women's roles 
The Bell Jar addresses the question of socially acceptable identity. It examines Esther's "quest to forge her own identity, to be herself rather than what others expect her to be."  Esther is expected to become a housewife, and a self-sufficient woman, without the options to achieve independence. Esther feels she is a prisoner to domestic duties and she fears the loss of her inner self. The Bell Jar sets out to highlight the problems with oppressive patriarchal society in mid-20th-century America.

Throughout the novel, Esther internally muses about sex, virginity, and the expectations on her as a woman therein. A major plot point in the later chapters is Esther being provided a contraceptive implant by a doctor, which allows her to lose her virginity without fear of falling pregnant and thus being expected become a parent before her time.  Earlier in the novel, Esther criticizes the double standard of the expectation that she remains a virgin for Buddy (who intends to marry her), whilst Buddy was able to have a casual sexual relationship with another woman earlier in his life without consequence.

Esther appears to take a near-scientific approach to sex and virginity. A chapter of the novel discusses Esther's plan to "have an affair" with someone, simply to "get it over with" (that is, to lose her virginity), but she is too fearful of the impact of pregnancy. 

Esther also remarks about her fear of marriage and the constraints a "typical" marriage of the era would have on her identity and personal goals.

Mental health 
Esther describes her life as being suffocated by a bell jar. A bell jar is a thick glass display container sometimes used to create a vacuum space.  Here, it stands for "Esther's mental suffocation by the unavoidable settling of depression upon her psyche". Throughout the novel, Esther talks of it suffocating her, and recognizes moments of clarity when it is lifted. These moments correlate to her mental state and the effect of her depression. Scholars argue about the nature of Esther's "bell jar" and what it can stand for. Some say it is a retaliation against suburban lifestyle, others believe it represents the standards set for a woman's life. However, when considering the nature of Sylvia Plath's own life and death and the parallels between The Bell Jar and her life, it is hard to ignore the theme of mental illness.

Psychiatrist Aaron Beck studied Esther's mental illness and notes two causes of depression evident in her life. The first is formed from early traumatic experiences, her father's death when she was 9 years old. It is evident how affected she is by this loss when she wonders, "I thought how strange it had never occurred to me before that I was only purely happy until I was nine years old." The second cause of her depression is from her perfectionist ideologies. Esther is a woman of many achievements – college, internships and perfect grades. It is this success that puts the unattainable goals into her head, and when she doesn't achieve them, her mental health suffers. Esther laments, "The trouble was, I had been inadequate all along, I simply hadn't thought about it."

Esther Greenwood has an obvious mental break – that being her suicide attempt which dictates the latter half of the novel. However, Esther's entire life shows warning signs that cause this depressive downfall. The novel begins with her negative thoughts surrounding all her past and current life decisions. It is this mindset mixed with the childhood trauma and perfectionist attitude that causes her descent that leads her to attempt suicide.

This novel gives an account of the treatment of mental health in the 1950s. Plath speaks through Esther's narrative to describe her experience of her mental health treatment. Just as this novel gives way to feminist discourse and challenges the way of life for women in the 1950s, it also gives a case study of a woman struggling with mental health.

Parallels in Plath's life
The book contains many references to real people and events in Plath's life. Plath's magazine scholarship was at Mademoiselle magazine beginning in 1953. Philomena Guinea is based on author Olive Higgins Prouty, Plath's own patron, who funded Plath's scholarship to study at Smith College. Plath was rejected from a Harvard course taught by Frank O'Connor. Dr. Nolan is thought to be based on Ruth Beuscher, Plath's therapist, whom she continued seeing after her release from the hospital. A good portion of this part of the novel closely resembles the experiences chronicled by Mary Jane Ward in her autobiographical novel The Snake Pit; Plath later stated that she had seen reviews of The Snake Pit and believed the public wanted to see "mental health stuff", so she deliberately based details of Esther's hospitalization on the procedures and methods outlined in Ward's book. Plath was a patient at McLean Hospital, an upscale facility which resembled the "snake pit" much less than wards in the Metropolitan State Hospital, which may have been where Mary Jane Ward was hospitalized.

In a 2006 interview, Joanne Greenberg said that she had been interviewed in 1986 by one of the women who had worked on Mademoiselle with Plath in the college guest editors group. The woman claimed that Plath had put so many details of the students' lives into The Bell Jar that "they could never look at each other again", and that it had caused the breakup of her marriage and possibly others.

Janet McCann links Plath's search for female independence with a self-described neurotic psychology. Ted Hughes, Plath's husband, suggested that The Bell Jar might have been written as a response to many years of electroshock treatment and the scars it left.

Reception
The Bell Jar received "warily positive reviews".  The short time span between the publication of the book and Plath's suicide resulted in "few innocent readings" of the novel.

The majority of early readers focused primarily on autobiographical connections from Plath to the protagonist. In response to autobiographical criticism, critic Elizabeth Hardwick urged that readers distinguish between Plath as a writer and Plath as an "event".  Robert Scholes, writing for The New York Times, praised the novel's "sharp and uncanny descriptions". Mason Harris of the West Coast Review complimented the novel as using "the 'distorted lens' of madness [to give] an authentic vision of a period which exalted the most oppressive ideal of reason and stability." Howard Moss of The New Yorker gave a mixed review, praising the "black comedy" of the novel, but added that there was "something girlish in its manner [that] betrays the hand of the amateur novelist".

On November 5, 2019, the BBC News listed The Bell Jar on its list of the 100 most inspiring novels.

Legacy and adaptations

The Bell Jar has been referred to many times in popular media. Iris Jamahl Dunkle wrote of the novel that "often, when the novel appears in American films and television series, it stands as a symbol for teenage angst."

Larry Peerce's The Bell Jar (1979) starred Marilyn Hassett as Esther Greenwood, and featured the tagline: "Sometimes just being a woman is an act of courage." In the film, Joan attempts to get Esther to agree to a suicide pact, which does not occur in the book.

In July 2016, it was announced that Kirsten Dunst would be making her directorial debut with an adaptation of The Bell Jar starring Dakota Fanning as Esther Greenwood. In August 2019, it was announced Dunst was no longer attached and Bell Jar will become a limited TV series from Showtime.

See also
 1963 in literature

References

Further reading

External links
 
 
 A page of Bell Jar book covers
 Faber profile
 The Bell Jar BBC profile
 "Sylvia Plath: The Bell Jar", Salon, October 5, 2000
 "The Bell Jar at 40", Emily Gould, Poetry Foundation
 The Bell Jar at the British Library

1963 American novels
1963 debut novels
American autobiographical novels
American novels adapted into films
Books by Sylvia Plath
Cultural depictions of Julius and Ethel Rosenberg
First-person narrative novels
Heinemann (publisher) books
Novels about mental health
Novels about suicide
Novels set in Boston
Novels set in New York City
Psychotherapy in fiction
Roman à clef novels
Works published under a pseudonym